Vintage Books is a trade paperback publishing imprint of Penguin Random House originally established by Alfred A. Knopf in 1954. The company was acquired by Random House in April 1960, and a British division was set up in 1990. After Random House merged with Bantam Doubleday Dell, Doubleday's Anchor Books trade paperback line was added to the same division as Vintage. Following Random House's merger with Penguin, Vintage was transferred to Penguin UK.

In addition to publishing classic and contemporary works in paperback under the Vintage brand, the imprint also oversees the sub-imprints Bodley Head, Jonathan Cape, Chatto and Windus, Harvill Secker, Hogarth Press, Square Peg, and Yellow Jersey. Vintage began publishing some titles in the mass-market paperback format in 2003.

Notable authors

 William Faulkner
 Vladimir Nabokov
 Cormac McCarthy
 Albert Camus
 Ralph Ellison
 Dashiell Hammett
 William Styron
 Philip Roth
 Toni Morrison
 Dave Eggers
 Robert Caro
 Haruki Murakami
 Gabriel Garcia Marquez
 James Ellroy

First editions

Vintage Books have "First Edition" printed on the copyright page with a '1' that is present.

References

External links
Doubleday, Vintage Team with Production Company on New Imprint
Vintage Books
Vintage Books UK
Publishing history timeline

Book publishing companies based in New York (state)
Companies based in New York City
Random House
Publishing companies established in 1954
1960 mergers and acquisitions